Middlesex Middle School is a middle school in the Darien Public Schools district in Darien, Connecticut, United States. The school serves students from sixth through eighth grades. Each grade is divided into 4 teams of around 90 to 150 students. In eighth grade there are the Teal (formerly Tan), Maroon, Navy and Green teams, for seventh grade there are the Gold, Purple, Aqua and Blue teams and for sixth grade there are the Yellow (formerly Bronze), Silver, Red and Orange teams.

Awards and recognition

Middlesex has been selected as a National Blue Ribbon School but, according to former principal Shelley Somers, the Blue Ribbon "blew down in a storm" in September 2017. 

Middlesex donates to various charity organizations such as UNICEF. For example, the school has been a nationwide leading contributor to UNICEF for 2004 to 2006, based on its size. In addition, a daffodil drive is held every year to help raise money for cancer. In May 2006, American Idol runner-up Clay Aiken made a surprise visit to the school in gratitude for its UNICEF contributions of $14,000 that year.

In Feb. 2007 Middlesex MathCounts team won the first prize in the South-Western CT MathCounts competition, while the team captain 8th grade student Michael Kushnir won the individual 1st prize. The team went on to Connecticut's statewide MathCounts competition to win the 2nd place, yielding to perennial champion Hopkins School. Kushnir advanced to the second round and won the individual 2nd place prize.

In the school year of 2007 and 2008, the school helped Good Morning America's coat drive, and also held a coat drive of their own.

The 2013 yearbook (Tidings) entitled "Facts + Figures" received a Gold Medal critique from the Columbia Scholastic Press Association and won a 2014 Gold Crown from CSPA.

Middlesex is also the highest performing school for the National Geography Bee in Connecticut. In twenty-four of those years MMS' own geography bee champions have qualified for the statewide rounds and took the state championship in 1989, 2005, 2006, 2011, 2012, 2013, 2014, and 2018-representing Connecticut eight times at nationals.

On April 20, 2016, Middlesex was the chosen site for the National History Bee's Bridgeport Regional Finals. In 2016, Middlesex's quiz bowl team also won national championship titles at both the inaugural US Academic Bowl National Championships, and the Middle School National Championship Tournament organized by NAQT. Middlesex's quiz bowl team has also been 3rd in the 2017 nationals and 5th in the 2018 nationals.

Middlesex offers STEM and computer courses as part of its curriculum. Part of this curriculum includes the Google Expeditions AR program — a unique experience offered to select schools nationally to introduce Augmented Reality educational tools under development.

History

The 1937 school building, a brick Colonial revival structure, sits on a  site at 204 Hollow Tree Ridge Road. The building underwent a major, $27 million addition and renovation in the late 1990s, which was completed in 2000.

In 1983, Middlesex was changed from a junior high school to a middle school. The ninth grade was transferred at that point to Darien High School.

Since 2005, the school district has been gradually equipping the school with air conditioning.

Pictures

Notes

External links 
  Middlesex Middle School website
  Great Schools web pages about the school
  Darien Public Schools Website
  Darien High School Website (DHS)
  Darien a Darién Program Website

Buildings and structures in Darien, Connecticut
Schools in Fairfield County, Connecticut
Middle schools in Connecticut